Life, Love 'n Music is the second studio album of South African singer-songwriter and record producer Zonke. It was released on 1 January 2007 through Kalawa Jazmee Records. Preceding its release were two singles titled "Ekhaya" and "Nomanyange" with the former going on to be nominated in the "Record of the Year" category at the 14th South African Music Awards.

Track listing

Release history

Accolades

References

2007 albums
Zonke albums
Kalawa Jazmee Records albums